Arthur Cook may refer to:

Arthur Cook (Australian politician) (1883–1945), Australian politician
Arthur Cook (cricketer) (1889–1970), South African cricketer
Arthur Cook (footballer) (1890–?), footballer for Swansea Town and West Bromwich Albion
Arthur Cook (labourer) (1885–1943), New Zealand labourer and trade unionist
Arthur Cook (New Zealand politician) (1886–1943), New Zealand politician
Arthur Cook (sport shooter) (born 1928), U.S. Olympic sport shooter
Arthur Bernard Cook (1868–1952), British classical scholar
A. J. Cook (trade unionist) (1883–1931), British coal miner and trade union leader
Arthur Leonard Cook (born 1912), Australian boxer
Arthur Cook (Pennsylvania), Speaker of the Pennsylvania Provincial Assembly in 1689

See also 
Arthur Coke Burnell (1840–1882), pronounced Arthur Cook Burnell, English scholar of Sanskrit